Wichita State University Campus of Applied Sciences and Technology (WSU Tech and previously the Wichita Area Technical College) is a public community college in Wichita, Kansas, United States. It was known as the Wichita Area Technical College before its affiliation with Wichita State University. WSU Tech is accredited by the Higher Learning Commission, coordinated by the Kansas Board of Regents (KBOR), and governed by the Sedgwick County Technical Education and Training Authority Board (SCTETA). WSU Tech operates four different campuses throughout the metropolitan area of Wichita. Its main campus is the National Center for Aviation Training (NCAT).

History

Governance
The Kansas Board of Regents governs six universities and coordinates and supervises Kansas' 19 community colleges, five technical colleges, and five technical schools. Within the Kansas Board of Regents' purview is the establishment of policies related to all institutions and the approval of all programs and course offerings. Courses may be submitted for approval on an as-needed basis, and program approvals may be submitted monthly. Institutions that wish to deliver approved programs or courses within the service area governed by the Kansas Wichita Area Technical College Board of Regents must seek approval from that university annually. However, technical schools and colleges located in the same county as a regents' university do not fall under this regulation.

References

External links
 

Public universities and colleges in Kansas
Two-year colleges in the United States
Education in Wichita, Kansas
Educational institutions established in 1965
Buildings and structures in Wichita, Kansas
1965 establishments in Kansas